This is a list of Arthur (TV series) merchandise, including home videos and DVDs, CDs, video games, books, and toys.

Home video releases

VHS and DVD releases

Notes 

 A Additional on DVD

Albums

Books

Arthur Adventure Series 

 1976 - Arthur's Nose
 1979 - Arthur's Eyes
 1980 - Arthur's Valentine
 1981 - The True Francine
 1982 - Arthur Goes to Camp
 1982 - Arthur's Halloween
 1983 - Arthur's April Fool
 1983 - Arthur's Thanksgiving
 1984 - Arthur's Christmas
 1985 - Arthur's Tooth
 1986 - Arthur's Teacher Trouble
 1987 - Arthur's Baby
 1988 - D.W. All Wet
 1989 - Arthur's Birthday
 1990 - Arthur's Pet Business
 1991 - Arthur Meets the President (Early Moments)
 1992 - Arthur Babysits
 1993 - D.W. Thinks Big
 1993 - D.W. Rides Again
 1993 - Arthur's Family Vacation
 1993 - Arthur's New Puppy
 1994 - Arthur's First Sleepover
 1994 - Arthur's Chicken Pox
 1995 - Arthur's TV Trouble
 1995 - D.W., the Picky Eater
 1995 - Arthur Goes to School
 1996 - Arthur Writes a Story
 1996 - Arthur's Reading Race
 1996 - Glasses for D.W.
 1996 - Arthur's Neighborhood
 1996 - Arthur and the True Francine
 1997 - Arthur's Computer Disaster
 1997 - Say the Magic Word
 1997 - D.W.'s Lost Blankie
 1997 - Arthur's Really Helpful Word Book
 1997 - Arthur Tricks the Tooth Fairy
 1998 - Arthur Lost and Found
 1998 - Arthur's Really Helpful Bedtime Stories
 1998 - Arthur Decks the Hall
 1999 - Arthur's Underwear
 2000 - Arthur's Teacher Moves In
 2000 - Arthur's Perfect Christmas
 2002 - Arthur, It's Only Rock 'n' Roll
 2006 - Arthur Jumps into Fall
 2011 - Arthur Turns Green

References

Merchandise
Arthur (TV series)